John A. Gosling (May 18, 1928 in Trenton, New Jersey – October 18, 2004 in Savannah, Georgia) was an American trumpeter and conductor of classical music. He studied trumpet (under William Vacchiano) and conducting at the Juilliard School in New York. He served as music director of the Erie Philharmonic from 1967 to 1973, and of the North Carolina Symphony in 1973. He founded the Bear Valley Music Festival in Bear Valley, California in 1968, where he served until 1984 as conductor and music director.

References

1928 births
2004 deaths
Musicians from Trenton, New Jersey
Juilliard School alumni
American male conductors (music)
Classical musicians from New Jersey
20th-century American conductors (music)
20th-century American male musicians